Buki Shiff is an Israeli opera and theatre costume and set designer.

Buki Shiff was born in Tel Aviv, Israel.

In 2008, she made her debut with The Royal Opera, designing costumes for La Calisto, directed by David Alden.

Shiff won Best Costume Designer at the 2013 International Opera Awards, Best Stage and Costume Designer at the 2006 Israeli Theater Awards, and the 2008 Rosenblum Award for Artist of the Year.

Shiff is based in Tel Aviv.

References

External links

Living people
Israeli designers
Costume designers
People from Tel Aviv
Year of birth missing (living people)